Winter Song is the ninth album by John Tesh. It was released by GTS Records in 1993.

Track listing

Track information and credits adapted from the album's liner notes.

Musicians 
 John Tesh – grand piano 
 Paul Viapiano – guitars 
 Tim Landers – electric bass 
 Randy Tico – electric bass 
 Susan Greenberg – flute
 Joan Elardo – oboe
 Calvin Smith – French horn

String section
 John Bisharat – conductor 
 Barbara Nahlik – orchestra manager 
 John Patitucci, Dave Stone and Tom Warrington – bass
 Matthew Cooker, Steve Erdody, Sebastian Toettcher, Ed Willett and John Walz – cello 
 Katie Kirkpatrick – harp
 Dmitri Boviard, Karie Prescott, Nancy Roth, John Scanlon, Ray Tischer and Herschel Wise – viola 
 Charlie Bisharat, Jackie Brand, Darius Campo, Joel Derouin, Charlie Everett, Juliann French, Armen Garabedian, Liane Mautner, Maria Newman, Sid Page, Rachel Robinson, Anatoly Rosinsky, Bob Sanov, David Stenske and Roger Wilkie – violin

Production 
 John Tesh – producer 
 Chris Chandler – recording 
 Ross Pallone – recording, mixing 
 Chris Bellman – mastering at Bernie Grundman Mastering (Hollywood, California)
 Gib Gerard – production assistant 
 Vu Tran – art direction 
 Charles William Bush – back photography
 Reid Wheatley – front photography
 Teri Meredyth – piano technician

Charts

References

External links
Artist Official Site

1993 albums
John Tesh albums